In the Gentofte train crash at Gentofte station, Denmark, on the island of Zealand, on 11 July 1897 an express train pulled by a DSB class CS (0-4-2) number 245 passed a signal cautioning danger and collided with a stationary passenger train waiting at the station. There were 40 deaths and more than 100 people were injured.

References

Disasters in Copenhagen
Train collisions in Denmark
Railway accidents in 1897
Railway accidents involving a signal passed at danger
1897 in Denmark
Train crash
Rail accidents caused by a driver's error